Acetropis gimmerthalii is a species of true bug in the family Miridae.

Description

Ecology
The species are active from June to September, and can be found in various dry and damp grasslands.

References

Insects described in 1968
Miridae